Eskay Video Private Limited is an Indian Company promoted by Dhanuka Family. The Company was incorporated in 1988 and since then it has been a vital part in the Media and Entertainment Industry in India. The company has produced more than 50 films and acquired another 200 films. Eskay group has digitized 80+ Cinemas, Operated Television Channels, owns 5 Theatres, produced Television serials, Reality shows and Webseries. 

In 2019, Eskay opened up a Subsidiary in UK - High Five Productions Limited and the company is growing globally, providing Filming Equipment services and line production services to Indian films which are shot in the UK. Eskay has invested around 10 Million Pounds, equivalently in Filming Equipment and Post Production facilities in India. Internationally, Eskay's film - Doob ( English title - No bed of Roses ) was the official selection for Oscar. It is the first Bengali film of late legendary star Irrfan Khan.

History

1988–2009: Early years and initial releases 
Eskay Movies was founded by Ashok and Himanshu Dhanuka in 1988. In 2005, Eskay released their first feature film, Chore Chore Mastuto Bhai, starring Mithun Chakraborty, Chiranjeet Chakraborty, Jisshu Sengupta. From 2008, Eskay would begin to release films every year, such as Bhalobasa Bhalobasa, Dujone, and Jamai Raja.

2010–2013: Commercial successes 
Eskay Movies released two films in 2010, Kohono Biday Bolo Na and Wanted, the latter of which became popular for its director-actor duo of Rabi Kinagi and Jeet. After releasing Hello Memsaheb, Eskay would go on to release Fighter and Shotru in 2011.

Eskay began 2012 with the critically acclaimed film Khokababu starring Dev and Subhashree Ganguly, which became one of the highest grossing Bengali films. Eskay would go on to release Bikram Singha: The Lion Is Back and Idiot. After the successful release of Kanamachi, Eskay released Khoka 420 and Khiladi, with the former becoming a box office success. Eskay has also acquired the rights to remake the hit youth-centric romantic comedy Kannada movie Googly.

2014–present: India-Bangladesh joint ventures and critical acclaim 
Eskay Movies' sole release in 2014 was Ami Shudhu Cheyechi Tomay, which was co-produced with Bangladeshi film company Action Cut Entertainment. The film, which won the award for Best Bengali Film at the 2015 Kalakar Awards, would go on to spark a trend of Indo-Bangla joint venture films, most of which would be a co-production of Eskay Movies and Jaaz Multimedia.

Aside from their film Mayer Biye, Eskay Movies co-produced three films with Jaaz Multimedia in 2015: Romeo vs Juliet, Agnee 2 and Aashiqui: True Love. Despite having initial success with the audience, Romeo vs Juliet, a remake of the film Jatt & Juliet, was panned critically. Agnee 2, a sequel to the Bangladeshi film Agnee, was released to commercial success but mixed critical reception. Aashiqui: True Love would launch the career of actress Nusrat Faria in both India and Bangladesh.

Eskay Movies released seven films in 2016, all of which were co-produced by Jaaz Multimedia: Angaar, Hero 420, Niyoti, Badsha – The Don, Shikari, Prem Ki Bujhini and Rokto. The year began with two films starring Om, Angaar, a drama, and Hero 420, a romantic comedy. Hero 420  was released for the occasion of Valentine's Day, releasing on 12 February in India and 19 February in Bangladesh. After debuting in Angaar, Jolly starred alongside acclaimed actor Arifin Shuvo in the film Niyoti, which released in India in June and in Bangladesh in August. Badsha – The Don, a remake of the film Don Seenu starring Jeet and Nusrat Faria, received commercial success and mixed critical reception. Shikari, which stars Shakib Khan and Srabanti Chatterjee, was a commercial success and received critical acclaim, leading to a Best Film win at the Kalakar Awards, where Srabanti Chatterjee also won Best Actress. Shikari also led for two Best Actor wins for Shakib Khan, at the Tele Cine Awards and Bangladesh's Meril Prothom Alo Awards. Prem Ki Bujhini received negative reception while Rokto received mixed reception.

In 2017, Eskay Movies released two Indian films, The Bongs Again and Byomkesh O Agnibaan, and two films co-produced with Jaaz Multimedia, Nabab and Doob: No Bed of Roses. The Bongs Again, a sequel to The Bong Connection, received mixed reception. Byomkesh O Agnibaan, a sequel to Byomkesh O Chiriyakhana, also received mixed reception. Both Nabab and Doob were a box office successes and received critical acclaim, but Doob, starring Irrfan Khan, received international praise, competing at the Shanghai International Film Festival and winning at the Moscow International Film Festival.

Films

Released

References

Entertainment companies of India
Companies based in Kolkata
Mass media companies established in 1988
Film production companies of India
1988 establishments in West Bengal
Indian companies established in 1988